Josif Miladinov (born 23 June 2003) is a Bulgarian swimmer. He competed in the 2020 Summer Olympics.

References

2003 births
Living people
Sportspeople from Plovdiv
People from Uster
Swimmers at the 2020 Summer Olympics
Bulgarian male swimmers
Olympic swimmers of Bulgaria
21st-century Bulgarian people